Chelidoni may also refer to a settlement near Andritsaina, part of the municipal district of Dafnoula

Chelidoni is a village in the municipality of Ancient Olympia, Elis, Greece. In 2011 its population was 550. It is located in the southwestern foothills of the Foloi plateau, 3 km west of Kryoneri, 8 km north of Olympia and 17 km east of Pyrgos. The village suffered damage from the 2007 Greek forest fires. Chelidoni is also a locality near Ayios Alexandros in the district of Paphos, in the Republic of Cyprus.

Population

See also

List of settlements in Elis

References

External links
 Chelidoni GTP Travel Pages
 
 website

Populated places in Elis